Cyclophora scriptata is a moth in the  family Geometridae. It is found on Borneo. The habitat consists of lowland areas.

The wings have a pale yellow ground colour with curved postmedial lines and 'B' shaped markings.

References

Moths described in 1861
Cyclophora (moth)
Moths of Borneo